Ren Sato may refer to:
 Ren Sato (politician)
 Ren Sato (racing driver)